Wakil Hussain Allahdad (1986-2018) was an ethnic Hazara wrestler, entrepreneur and community first responder in Afghanistan.

History 
Wakil Hussain Allahdad was born in 1986 in Afghanistan in a family who were members of the Hazara ethnic group. He started wrestling in 1998 at age 12. He was taught by Sher Jan Ahmadi, deputy head of the country's wrestling federation. His weight class was 214 pounds and he won many medals in domestic tournaments, as well as a silver medal at an international tournament in Pakistan. He retired from wrestling in 2014 after tearing a muscle in his leg and began coaching at a local wrestling club, teaching 150 students daily.

During the 11 October 2016 attack on the Karte Sakhi Shrine, he was one of the rescuers and was photographed carrying a wounded girl in an Agence France-Presse image that was widely circulated. He was also a rescuer in the June 2017 Kabul mosque attack.

He was also an entrepreneur who ran multiple small businesses including a crockery shop, travel agency and photography shop.

He was killed in the 22 April 2018 Kabul suicide bombing in the Dashte Barchi area of Kabul, which occurred across the street from his photography shop. He was taken to Isteqlal hospital before being transferred to a trauma facility run by the Italian NGO Emergency where he died.

Personal life 
Allahdad was married and had four children, including two sons and two girls.

See also 
 22 April 2018 Kabul suicide bombing
 List of Hazara people
 Mohammad Ebrahim Khedri

References

External links 
 hindustantimes.com/Kabul’s ‘invincible hero’ who rushed to help bomb blast victims killed in explosion
 facebook.com

1986 births
2018 deaths
Hazara businesspeople
Hazara sportspeople
Afghan male sport wrestlers
Sportspeople from Kabul
Terrorism deaths in Afghanistan
Afghan businesspeople